Raimbert of Lille (fl. c. 1100) was an early medieval nominalist who taught at Lille. Along with Roscelin, he was an opponent of exaggerated realism. His nominalism was attacked by Odo of Tournai.

References 

French philosophers
11th-century French philosophers
12th-century French philosophers